Estye is a surname. Notable people with the surname include:

George Estye (1566–1601), English divine
Mary Estye, victim of the Salem witch trials